Events in the year 2019 in Ecuador.

Incumbents
 President of Ecuador - Lenín Moreno
 Vice President of Ecuador - Otto Sonnenholzner

Events 
 13 June - The Supreme Court of Ecuador votes to legalize same-sex marriage
 2019 Ecuadorian protests

See also
 	

 		
 2019 Pan American Games

References

Links
 

 
Years of the 21st century in Ecuador
Ecuador
Ecuador
2010s in Ecuador